The 1955–56 Iowa Hawkeyes men's basketball team represented the University of Iowa in intercollegiate basketball during the 1955–56 season. After opening the season 3–5, the team won 17 consecutive games to finish with a 20–6 record (13–1 in Big Ten), and won their second straight Big Ten title. The Hawkeyes also made their second consecutive trip to the Final Four, defeating Temple before falling to the unbeaten, back-to-back National champion San Francisco Dons in the title game.

Roster
The group of seniors on this team – Sharm Scheuerman, Bill Logan, Carl Cain, Bill Seaberg and Bill Schoof – are known to Hawkeye fans as the "Fabulous Five."

Schedule/results

|-
!colspan=9 style=|Regular season
|-

|-
!colspan=9 style=|NCAA tournament

Rankings

Awards and honors
 Carl Cain – Honorable Mention AP All-American
 Bill Logan – Honorable Mention AP All-American

References

Iowa Hawkeyes men's basketball seasons
Iowa
NCAA Division I men's basketball tournament Final Four seasons
Iowa
Iowa Hawkeyes Men's Basketball Team
Iowa Hawkeyes Men's Basketball Team